The 1991–92 UC Irvine Anteaters men's basketball team represented the University of California, Irvine during the 1991–92 NCAA Division I men's basketball season. The Anteaters were led by first year head coach Rod Baker and played at the Bren Events Center. They were members of the Big West Conference.

Previous season 
The 1990–91 UC Irvine Anteaters men's basketball team finished the season with a record of 11–19 and 6–12 in Big West play. On 14 February 1991, Mulligan announced that he will resign as head coach at the end of the season. Seton Hall assistant Rod Baker was hired on 9 April 1991 to become the fifth head coach in anteater history.

Roster

Schedule

|-
!colspan=9 style=|Non-Conference Season

|-
!colspan=9 style=|Conference Season

|-
!colspan=9 style=| Big West Conference  tournament

Source

References

UC Irvine Anteaters men's basketball seasons
UC Irvine
UC Irvine Anteaters
UC Irvine Anteaters